Romanovka is a rural locality (a selo) and the administrative centre of Vitimskoye Rural Settlement, Bauntovsky District, Republic of Buryatia, Russia. The population was 1,198 as of 2017. There are 17 streets.

Geography 
Romanovka is located in the Vitim Plateau, 171 km south of Bagdarin (the district's administrative centre) by road. The P436 regional road connecting Ulan-Ude and  Chita passes through Romanovka across the plateau. Road P437 connecting Romanovka and Bagdarin begins in the town.

Climate

References 

Rural localities in Bauntovsky District